Dragiša "Dragi" Gudelj (Serbian Cyrillic: Драгиша Гудељ; born 8 November 1997) is a Serbian professional footballer who plays for Spanish club Córdoba as a left back. He also holds Dutch citizenship.

Club career 
Gudelj is the son of former NAC Breda player Nebojša Gudelj and he started his youth career in the Breda-based club.

On 6 May 2015, it was announced that Gudelj signed his first professional contract with Jong Ajax. He moved to Amsterdam along with his older brother Nemanja who signed a contract with Ajax's first team while their father Nebojša became a scout for the club.

References

External links

1997 births
Living people
Serbian footballers
Serbian expatriate footballers
Association football defenders
Serbia youth international footballers
Footballers from Breda
AFC Ajax players
Jong Ajax players
NAC Breda players
FC Wohlen players
Vitória S.C. B players
Cádiz CF B players
Córdoba CF players
Eerste Divisie players
Swiss Challenge League players
Liga Portugal 2 players
Campeonato de Portugal (league) players
Segunda División B players
Segunda Federación players
Dutch people of Serbian descent
Dutch people of Bosnia and Herzegovina descent
Serbian expatriate sportspeople in Switzerland
Serbian expatriate sportspeople in Spain
Expatriate footballers in Switzerland
Expatriate footballers in Spain